Radical 26 or radical seal meaning "seal" is one of the 23 Kangxi radicals (214 radicals total) composed of two strokes.

It usually transforms as  when appearing at the bottom of a Chinese character.

In the Kangxi Dictionary, there are 40 characters (out of 49,030) to be found under this radical.

 is also the 21st indexing component in the Table of Indexing Chinese Character Components predominantly adopted by Simplified Chinese dictionaries published in mainland China, with  being its associated indexing component.

Evolution

Derived characters

In Unihan database,  is indexed radical 26 + 1 stroke (3 strokes in total), with the extra stroke unspecified. Traditionally, this character or component consists of only two strokes (𠃌乚).

Literature

References

External links

Unihan Database - U+5369

026
021